WIPR-TV (channel 6) is a non-commercial educational public television station in San Juan, Puerto Rico, owned by the Corporación de Puerto Rico para la Difusión Pública (English: Puerto Rico Public Broadcasting Corporation). most programming on its main channel is locally originated. WIPR-TV's studios are located on Hostos Avenue in Hato Rey, and its transmitter is located at Cerro La Santa in Cayey near the Bosque Estatal de Carite mountain reserve.

Because of its audience, much of WIPR's programming is in Spanish, as with most Puerto Rico television stations. The station is branded as WIPR Television. Previously, the station was branded as Teve 6 / Teve 3, TUTV - Tu Universo Televisión and Puerto Rico TV.

WIPR-TV operates a semi-satellite on the island's west coast, WIPM-TV (channel 3) in Mayagüez. WIPM-TV largely repeats WIPR, but does produce some local programming. This station's transmitter is located atop Monte del Estado in Maricao.

History
WIPR-TV was created as a result of lobbying for public broadcasting in Puerto Rico, beginning in the 1950s. The station went on the air for the first time on Three Kings Day (January 6), 1958 becoming the first educational television station in Latin America, and the facilities were dedicated in memory of revered Borinquen entertainer Ramón Rivero (Diplo). It was also the first non-commercial station in the Caribbean, and the first to stream on the Internet.

The station was one of the few TV stations in Puerto Rico with English-language programming as part of their PBS membership, and also carried PBS Kids programming. This ended on July 1, 2011, after WIPR and PBS failed to reach an agreement to renew the station's membership, with money previously allocated to PBS membership dues being invested in the station's local programming. WMTJ then became the island's PBS station.

On April 26, 2022, WIPR-TV officially rejoined PBS after ten years as an educational independent station and returned to being Puerto Rico's primary PBS member station.

Programming
For years, WIPR-TV has shown local programming, including educational, children's and human interest shows.

Notiséis 360

In the 1980s the station had a highly praised newscast called Panorama Mundial ("World View"), hosted by Doris Torres.  In 1995, WIPR launched a newscast branded as Noti-Seis or "News Six". The newscast was first anchored by Pedro Luis García and Gloria Soltero and only had a 6:00 PM edition. Later that year, the station premiered a 9:00 PM edition anchored by the same 6:00 PM team.

In 2002, a new news format was created with a local newscast (TUTV Informa) and an international newscast (TUTV Internacional); the newscasts were anchored by Gloria Soltero and David Reyes. TUTV also produced a weekly in-depth newscast on Sundays, called TUTV Analiza.

TUTV's programming received various awards. Locally, En Todas was awarded by the American Heart Association.  Five productions received Emmy Award nominations and one of TUTV's producers received an Emmy in the Entertainment Program category.

On August 31, 2009, when TUTV was rebranded as "Puerto Rico TV", its news department was relaunched as Noticias 24/7; around this time, WIPR introduced a 24-hour news channel of the same name on channel 6.5 and 3.5.

On September 26, 2018, Noticias 24/7 was rebranded as Notiséis 360.

List of original programs seen on WIPR-TV

 Aquí Estamos with Shanira Blanco
 Estudio Actoral with Dean Zayas
 El Show De Chucho Avellanet Noches de Ayer with Tommy Muñiz
 Días de Cine with Edgardo Huertas
 En la Cancha with Tony Lebrón and Jerry González
 Esto lo hago Yo with Douglas Candelario
 Medios Sociales with Yizette Cifredo
 Sábados Sinfonicos Notiséis Especial Los Más Buscados Detrás del Fotógrafo Alianza al Día Música para Tus Oidos with Hermes Croatto
 Animaleando with Nynah
 Te Cuento lo que Leí Prohibido Olvidar Al Máximo con Geraldine Agenda Puerto Rico Impulso del Oeste En La Punta de la Lengua Travesías con Sabor Prohibido OlvidarTechnical information
The digital signals of WIPR and WIPM are multiplexed:

Digital and high definition
WIPR-TV, the island's first public television station, also became the first in the evolution to digital and high definition.

On July 7, 2008, President Víctor J. Montilla (now, Executive VP & general manager of New Channels at WORA-TV) held a press conference at the station, where he inaugurated WIPR-TV's high definition facilities. TUTV became the first station in Puerto Rico to produce and broadcast in high definition format. The station upgraded its lighting and built new sets as part of the transition. Some artists underwent lifestyle changes, including changes in their diet, to look better in high definition. The first program to be transmitted in this format was Contigo''.

See also
 WIPR (AM)
 WIPR-FM

References

External links 
WIPR-TV
Museum of Broadcasting and Communications: Puerto Rico

PBS member stations
Mass media in San Juan, Puerto Rico
IPR-TV
Television channels and stations established in 1958
1958 establishments in Puerto Rico
Public broadcasting in Puerto Rico